Tamsalu Parish was a rural municipality of Estonia, in Lääne-Viru County. It had a population of 3,726 (as of 2017) and an area of 214.61 km2.

Settlements
Town
Tamsalu
Small borough
Sääse
Villages
Aavere, Alupere, Araski, Assamalla, Järsi, Järvajõe, Kadapiku, Kaeva, Kerguta, Koiduküla, Koplitaguse, Kuie, Kullenga, Kursi, Lemmküla, Loksa, Metskaevu, Naistevälja, Piisupi, Porkuni, Põdrangu, Sauvälja, Savalduma, Türje, Uudeküla, Vadiküla, Vajangu, Vistla, Võhmetu, Võhmuta.

See also
Lake Porkuni
Battle of Porkuni
Uudeküla Bulldogs RFC

References

External links
 

Former municipalities of Estonia